The Holyoke Mall at Ingleside ( Holyoke Mall) is a shopping center located in Holyoke, Massachusetts, in the city's Ingleside neighborhood. It is owned by The Pyramid Companies. The mall features 135 stores, a large food court, and several restaurants and is 1.6 million square feet, the third-largest in New England by retail space.
The mall currently features Macy's, JCPenney, Target, Best Buy, Burlington, Hobby Lobby, and Christmas Tree Shops, as well as a post office.

The mall underwent cosmetic upgrades in 2015, which included new floors, lighting, and benches throughout the mall. Located near the interchange of I-90 and I-91, the Holyoke Mall is one of the primary shopping destinations in Western Massachusetts and attracts many out-of-state visitors.

History

The mall opened in 1979 with G. Fox, JCPenney, Sears, and Steiger's as the original anchors. Plans for the mall were approved in 1973, with $1.2 million granted for construction. Before construction on the mall began, the main access road, Whiting Farms Road, was extended and referred to as the "road to nowhere" by critics before opening. The mall had also opened with 125 retail stores and an eight-screen theater located in the basement alongside the food court. The mall was expanded and renovated in 1995, adding an entirely new wing to the mall with a relocated G. Fox being constructed at the end, as well as some of the first in-mall locations for Toys "R" Us and Christmas Tree Shops. At the time it was expanded, it was billed as the largest mall in New England. Around this time Lord & Taylor announced a store to be completed by November 1993. Pyramid in 1998 proposed a  expansion that would have added a 20-screen cinema complex, but this attempt was blocked by the city. Lord & Taylor repositioned and shuttered their space entirely in 2005. In September 2006, Filene's became Macy's.  In December 2019, it was reported a Cinemark 10 screen theater complex was in the early stages of development. It has since been put on hold.

Must be 18 controversy
In 2005, The Pyramid Corporation sparked local controversy over its "must be 18 policy",  especially from the local Latino population. The policy (implemented on September 9, 2005) requires all patrons under the age of eighteen to be accompanied by a parent or guardian on Friday and Saturday nights after 4:00 PM. Anyone who appears to be under 18 can be asked to show identification such as a school ID card or a driver's license. This policy is not enforced in the majority of the approximately twenty complexes managed by the Pyramid Corporation, largely located in suburban areas. Because of this, the mall has been accused of racism by the local community. Northampton City Councilor William H. Dwight, who serves on the Northampton Youth Commission, commented that because teenagers do not have as many places as adults to gather, they are frequently treated like pariahs. "It seems to me the mall is relatively safe. It's a shame that's gone," said Dwight. Pyramid has defended its decision by saying that it will increase sales because the environment will be more pleasing to adult shoppers and the incidence of shoplifting will be reduced.

References

External links

 Official website

Buildings and structures in Holyoke, Massachusetts
Shopping malls in Massachusetts
Shopping malls established in 1979
The Pyramid Companies
Tourist attractions in Hampden County, Massachusetts
1979 establishments in Massachusetts